Susan J. Isaacs (born December 18, 1946 in Nashville, Tennessee) is an American professional poker player, who has been based in Las Vegas, Nevada, since 1986.

Isaacs has finished in the money of six World Series of Poker (WSOP) ladies' events, and won the ladies' championship back-to-back in 1996 and 1997.

She finished tenth in the $10,000 no limit hold'em main event in 1998.

Isaacs was featured as a regular player in the Poker Royale: The James Woods Gang vs The Unabombers series. She is a regular contributor to Card Player Magazine.

As of 2010, her total live tournament winnings exceed $430,000.

Isaacs is also the author of two poker books:
 MsPoker: Up Close & Personal (August 25, 1999 - )
 1000 Best Poker Strategies and Secrets (May 17, 2006 - )

Isaacs has one son and two stepchildren.

World Series of Poker bracelets

References

External links
 Official site
 GuideToPoker profile
 PokerListings.com Player Profile
 PokerPages profile
 PokerPages interview
 Hendon Mob tournament results

American poker players
World Series of Poker bracelet winners
American gambling writers
Living people
Female poker players
1946 births